The following is a list of notable people associated with Utah Valley University, located in the American city of Orem, Utah.

Notable alumni
 Ricky Allman
 A. J. Cook
 Matthew Deane
 Michelle Despain
 Christopher Fogt
 Akwasi Frimpong
 Parley G. Hellewell
 Chelsie Hightower
 David Hinkins
 Greg Hughes
 C. Jane Kendrick
 John Knotwell
 Matthew S. Petersen
 Noelle Pikus-Pace
 Gary Lee Price
 G. William Richards
 Wesley Silcox
 Matangi Tonga (American football)
 Joseph Vogel

Notable faculty
 James Arrington
 Alex Caldiero
 Scott Carrier
 Alan W. Clarke
Carol Lynn Curchoe
Luke Dean
 Eugene England
 Dennis Fairclough
 Val Hale
 Jeffrey Nielsen
 Boyd Petersen
 Michael Shively
 Bennion Spencer

References

External links
Utah Valley University Alumni Association

Utah Valley University people
Utah Valley University